Allahabad is a city in the state of Uttar Pradesh, India. Historically it had been an important place of learning, attracting people from other places to the city to gain education.

Universities and colleges of Prayagraj

Universities

Central University
 University of Allahabad

Institutes of National Importance

 Indian Institute of Information Technology Allahabad
 Motilal Nehru National Institute of Technology

Deemed Universities
 Nehru Gram Bharati University, Prayagraj

Private Universities
 United University, Prayagraj

State Universities

 Prof. Rajendra Singh University, Prayagraj
 Sam Higginbottom University of Agriculture, Technology and Sciences
 Uttar Pradesh Rajarshi Tandon Open University

Autonomous college
 Ewing Christian College

Research institutes
 Botanical Survey of India (Central  Regional Centre), Prayagraj
 Centre for Social Forestry and Eco-Rehabilitation (a centre of ICFRE)
 Govind Ballabh Pant Social Science Institute
 Harish Chandra Research Institute
 Indian Institute of Geomagnetism (Regional Center)
 National Academy of Sciences, India

Medical institutes and colleges
 Kamla Nehru Memorial Hospital
 Motilal Nehru Medical College
 United Institute of Medical Sciences
 State Unani Medical College
 State Lal Bahadur Shastri Homeopathic Medical College
Government Ayurvedic College and Hospital

Campuses of other universities
 Birla Institute of Technology, Mesra (BIT Mesra, Prayagraj Campus)
 Mahatma Gandhi Antarrashtriya Hindi Vishwavidyalaya (Wardha, Prayagraj campus)
 Rashtriya Sanskrit Sansthan (Ganganath Jha Prayagraj Campus)

Engineering colleges
 Abhay Memorial Trust Group of Institutions 
 Allahabad Institute of Engineering and Technology 
 Ayodhya Prasad Management Institute and Technology 
 BBS College of Engineering and Technology
 Chhatrapati Shahuji Maharaj College of Engineering & Technology 
 Devprayag Institute of Technical Studies
 HMFA Memorial Institute of Engineering and Technology
 J.K. Institute of Applied Physics and Technology
 LDC Institute of Technical Studies
 Shambhunath Institute of Engineering and Technology
 SP Memorial Institute of Technology
 United College of Engineering & Research

Schools

 Agrasen Inter College
 Bethany Convent School
 Nyaya Nagar Public School, Jhunsi, Prayagraj 
 Boys' High School and College
 Brij Bihari Sahay Inter College, Shivkuti, Teliayarganj, Prayagraj
 Delhi Public School
 Dev Prayag School
 Ganga Gurukulam
 Girls' High School and College
 Government Intermediate College
 Holy Trinity School
 Jagat Taran Golden Jubilee School
 Kendriya Vidyalaya Bamrauli
 Laurels International School
 Maharshi Patanjali Vidya Mandir
 Patanjali Rishikul
 Ramanujan Public School
 Shiv Ganga Vidya Mandir, Phaphamau, Allahabad
 Saint John's Academy, Mirzapur Road, Allahabad
 St. Joseph's College

Universities and colleges in Allahabad district
Educational Institutions
Allahabad
Educational Institutions